Nahuel Alexander Donadell Alvarez (born 30 March 1991) is an Argentine naturalized Chilean footballer who currently plays for the Primera B de Chile side San Marcos de Arica, as a striker.

References

External links
Donadell at Football Lineups

1991 births
Living people
Sportspeople from Mendoza, Argentina
Argentine footballers
Naturalized citizens of Chile
Chilean footballers
Association football forwards
Unión Española footballers
Puerto Montt footballers
Deportes Valdivia footballers
San Antonio Unido footballers
General Velásquez footballers
San Marcos de Arica footballers
Chilean Primera División players
Segunda División Profesional de Chile players
Expatriate footballers in Chile
Argentine expatriate sportspeople in Chile
Argentine emigrants to Chile